The British Rail Class 710 Aventra is a type of electric multiple unit passenger train built by Bombardier Transportation for use on the London Overground network. The trains are part of Bombardier's Aventra family. The contract to provide 45 four-car trains was awarded in July 2015 and the trains were originally due to enter service in May 2018, although introduction was delayed until May 2019.

History

Background and specifications 

In 2012, Transport for London announced its intention to procure a fleet of new, longer DMUs, as the  units then in service were unable to handle the passenger demand, causing overcrowding throughout the day. TfL issued a tender for manufacturers to supply eight three- or four-car trains. However, this proposal was subsequently shelved when the Government announced in June 2013 that the Gospel Oak to Barking line would be electrified, with proposals instead to purchase a fleet of new EMUs.

TfL invited expressions of interest for a total of 39 four-car EMUs in April 2014, with 30 required for the Lea Valley Lines, eight for the Gospel Oak to Barking line, and one for the Romford–Upminster line - all of which have replaced Class 315 and Class 317 trains dating from the 1980s, and Class 172 trains dating from 2010. Since then the planned procurement was increased to 45 four-car EMUs, with the additional six units intended for the Watford DC Line. The intention is that the five-car  trains currently used on the Watford DC line will be cascaded back to the North London line and East London Lines to allow for strengthened services. TfL issued an Invitation to Tender (ITT) in early 2015, and in June 2015 announced that Bombardier had been awarded the contract to build the new trains.

In July 2015, TfL announced that it had placed a £260m order for 45 four-car Bombardier Aventra EMUs, with an option for 24 more four-car units plus further options to extend some or all units including option units to five cars. These are similar to the Class 345 and Class 720 trains that are currently used on the Elizabeth line and Greater Anglia services.

The units are delivered in two sub-classes; an AC-only version for use on the Lea Valley lines and Romford–Upminster services, and a dual-voltage version for the Watford DC and Gospel Oak to Barking line services. Both versions will have all-longitudinal seating after the plan to have some transverse seats on the AC units was dropped. The AC only version is maintained at Ilford EMU Depot and the dual-voltage units at Willesden TMD.

In 2017, Transport for London put forward a proposal to procure nine additional Class 710 units to be used as capacity enhancers.

Operation 

On 25 April 2018, the Islington Gazette reported that the trains would be introduced three months later than scheduled due to delays in their testing.

On 20 June 2018 the Barking & Dagenham Post reported that the trains would be in service by November 2018, "almost 18 months later than planned".

In November 2018, TfL said that they hoped the units would be in service by December 2018; however, further delays prevented this.

In January 2019, TfL announced that three Class 378 trains would temporarily be deployed on the Gospel Oak to Barking line while continued problems with the Class 710 units were resolved, since leases on the existing Class 172 stock running on this line would come to an end before the 710's likely introduction into passenger service.

In April 2019, the Office of Rail and Road approved the use of the Class 710, with restrictions.

On 22 May 2019 TfL announced that approval had been gained for the Class 710s to enter passenger service. The first two units entered service on the Gospel Oak to Barking line on Thursday 23 May 2019 and the remaining six were in service by August 2019, with the first unit entering service on the Watford DC line on 9 September 2019. The first units on the Lea Valley lines entered service on 3 March 2020 after a first attempt on 24 February 2020. The services on the Romford-Upminster line started on 5 October 2020. The Class 710/3 5 car units are operating on Watford DC line.

Incidents
On 12 October 2021, the driver and a passenger were injured when an eight-car Class 710 train, headed by unit 710124, ran through the buffers at Enfield Town. Following a post-crash drugs test that allegedly revealed traces of cocaine, the driver was arrested on suspicion of being unfit to work on a transport system through drink or drugs.

Fleet details

See also 
 London Overground
 British Rail Class 345
 Aventra

Notes

References

External links 

710
Bombardier Transportation multiple units
London Overground
25 kV AC multiple units
Train-related introductions in 2019